Aleksandar Railić (born 22 October 1979) is a Bosnian-Herzegovinian retired football midfielder who last played for FK Ljubić Prnjavor.

Club career
Born in Derventa, SFR Yugoslavia, now Bosnia and Herzegovina, his first club was FK Tekstilac Derventa. Since the 2000–01 season Aleksandar Railić has played for FK Željezničar Sarajevo and from 2007 NK Livar in Slovenian First League.

He signed a contract with NK Livar for Season 2007–08. In summer 2008 he considered joining Sloboda. He also played for FK Velež Mostar in the Bosnian Premier League.

References

External links
Profile at Siol.net

Velez team in Eufo with previous players clubs

1979 births
Living people
People from Derventa
Serbs of Bosnia and Herzegovina
Association football midfielders
Bosnia and Herzegovina footballers
FK Tekstilac Derventa players
FK Ljubić Prnjavor players
FK Modriča players
FK Željezničar Sarajevo players
FK Radnik Bijeljina players
NK Ivančna Gorica players
NK Krško players
FK Velež Mostar players
FK Krajina Cazin players
FK Borac Banja Luka players
FK Sloga Doboj players
Premier League of Bosnia and Herzegovina players
Slovenian PrvaLiga players
Slovenian Second League players
First League of the Republika Srpska players
Bosnia and Herzegovina expatriate footballers
Expatriate footballers in Slovenia
Bosnia and Herzegovina expatriate sportspeople in Slovenia